Richard Kozlow (May 5, 1926 – July 29, 2008) was an artist who lived in Detroit, Michigan.  During his prolific career he painted well over a thousand works.

Born in Detroit in 1926, Richard Kozlow's formal training was limited to his abbreviated studies at Cass Technical High School and the College for Creative Studies. After his 1946 discharge from the World War II United States Navy, Kozlow spent two years painting and working in New York City. Although his work had achieved some success (and a favorable New York Times mention), he returned to Detroit to marry the love of his life and "get a job".

At this time (as throughout his career), his paintings used materials in new ways, delving into the textures of old walls and peeling posters. He won (among others) the Museum Purchase prizes of the Detroit Institute of Arts and the Butler Art Institute.

Mexico
Despite a successful Detroit advertising career, winning creative awards and large salaries, in 1960 he left it all to live and paint in San Miguel de Allende, Mexico. Here he applied the new techniques he'd developed to creating the first of the misty mountain paintings which earned his international reputation.

Thus began the pattern of the rest of Richard Kozlow's life. With stays in between in Detroit and many short journeys, he lived and painted in beautiful places. In Majorca, Spain in 1962. In England in 1965. In Costa Rica in 1975. In Portugal and Spain in 1977. And so forth. Each sojourn was followed by a successful show. And, while the Kozlow touch was unmistakable in every show, his methods continued to evolve.

In the 1980s, he left his acrylics to achieve a new softness using oil paints. The allegorical "Soul of Mexico" paintings celebrated the spirit and the festivals of the Mexican people among whom he had lived so many times.

Richard Kozlow has had exhibitions in every region of the US and several foreign countries. Although the beautiful Kozlow landscapes have always been much in demand by collectors, many of his most powerful works are black tempera depictions of bloody bullfights, holocaust victims, and his enigmatic mid-90s "Masks" series.

Kozlow's work had always fallen into a middle and almost unique area: far too modern to describe him as a classic landscapist, yet too representational to put his paintings into a museum's modern wing. Recently there has been a renewed interest in Kozlow's works among art scholars, partly on the strength of his late-nineties paintings, complex self-portraits symbolizing the forces pressing on the life of a great artist.

External links
Catalogue of work
Obituary in the Detroit Free Press

1926 births
2008 deaths
Cass Technical High School alumni
United States Navy personnel of World War II